Sadaharu (written: 貞治) is a masculine Japanese given name. Notable people with the name include:

, Japanese Pastry chef with boutique in Paris
, Japanese-Taiwanese baseball player and manager
, Japanese journalist
Sadaharu Yagi, Japanese-born record producer, mixing engineer and recording engineer

See also
Sadahiro
Sadhara
Sadhora
Siddhara

Japanese masculine given names